Dardanus tinctor, the anemone hermit crab, is a species of marine hermit crab in the family Diogenidae. Dardanus tinctor is widespread throughout the tropical waters of the Indo-West Pacific region, including the Red Sea.

References 

Hermit crabs
Crustaceans described in 1775
Taxa named by Peter Forsskål